The Junior Solheim Cup is a version of the Solheim Cup for girls aged 12 to 18. It was inaugurated in 2002. It is currently officially called the PING Junior Solheim Cup. The Junior Solheim Cup follows a similar format to The Solheim Cup and features the top 12 U.S. amateur girls—defined as girls participating in American Junior Golf Association (AJGA) events—versus their European counterparts. College/university golfers are ineligible to participate in the event, even if they meet the age cutoff. The event is held over two days, with six fourball and six foursomes matches on the first day, and twelve singles matches on the second day.

Each event has been held in the general vicinity of that year's Solheim Cup. The United States has won 7 of the 11 contests, with Europe winning 3, while the 2011 match ended in a tie.

Many Junior Solheim Cup players go on to play in the Solheim Cup. Of the victorious 12-woman European side at Gleneagles in 2019, 10 members had previously played in the Junior Solheim Cup.

Results

Notes

Teams
Source:

United States
2021: Amari Avery, Anna Davis, Megha Ganne, Sara Im, Katie Li, Alexa Pano, Catherine Rao, Kaitlyn Schroeder, Bailey Shoemaker, Yana Wilson, Kelly Xu, Avery Zweig
2019: Phoebe Brinker, Zoe Antoinette Campos, Briana Chacon, Sadie Englemann, Rachel Heck, Lucy Li, Michaela Morard, Brianna Navarrosa, Alexa Pano, Amanda Sambach, Christine Wang, Rose Zhang
2017: Alyaa Abdulghany, Jennifer Chang, Youngin Chun, Rachel Heck, Gina Kim, Lucy Li, Emilia Migliaccio, Yealimi Noh, Kaitlyn Papp, Brooke Seay, Erica Shepherd, Rose Zhang
2015: Sierra Brooks, Hailee Cooper, Mariel Galdiano, Kristen Gillman, Megan Khang, Nelly Korda, Andrea Lee, Mika Liu, Haley Moore, Hannah O'Sullivan, Kaitlyn Papp, Angel Yin
2013: Casie Cathrea, Karen Chung, Casey Danielsson, Alexandra Kaui, Alison Lee, Amy Lee, Andrea Lee, Nicole Morales, Krystal Quihuis, Ashlan Ramsey, Samantha Wagner, Bethany Wu
2011: Karen Chung, Jaye Marie Green, Kyung Kim, Alison Lee, Esther Lee, Ashlan Ramsey, Summar Roachell, Mariah Stackhouse, Mckenzie Talbert, Emma Talley, Gabriella Then, Lindsey Weaver
2009: Sarah Brown, Ani Gulugian, Jennifer Johnson, Stephanie Kim, Jessica Korda, Alison Lee, Tiffany Lua, Kristen Park, Jane Rah, Alexandra Stewart, Lexi Thompson, Kristina Wong
2007: Sydney Burlison, Brianna Do, Courtney Ellenbogen, Mina Harigae, Vicky Hurst, Kimberly Kim, Stephanie Kono, Isabelle Lendl, Tiffany Lua, Kristen Park, Jane Rah, Allie White
2005: Jennie Arseneault, Lila Barton, Sydney Burlison, Esther Choe, Kimberly Donovan, Megan Grehan, Taylor Karle, Kimberly Kim, Sydnee Michaels, Morgan Pressel, Jane Rah, Catherina Wang
2003: Amanda Blumenherst, Esther Choe, Amie Cochran, Paula Creamer, Lauren Espinosa, Allison Goodman, Taylor Leon, Brittany Lincicome, Whitney Meyers, Jennifer Pandolfi, Jane Park, Christie Reed
2002: Amanda Blumenherst, Mallory Code, Paula Creamer, Nicole Hage, Ashley Knoll, Brittany Lang, Brittany Lincicome, Allison Martin, Jennifer Pandolfi, Jane Park, Morgan Pressel, Whitney Wade

Europe
2021: Helen Briem, Savannah De Bock, Cayetana Fernández, Francesca Fiorellini, Constance Fouillet, Vairana Heck, Amalie Leth-Nissen, Meja Örtengren, Andrea Revuelta, Paula Schulz-Hanssen, Nora Sundberg, Denisa Vodickova
2019: Pia Babnik, Hannah Darling, Annabell Fuller, Lily May Humphreys, Amalie Leth-Nissen, Lucie Malchirand, Benedetta Moresco, Alessia Nobilio, Anne Normann, Lilas Pinthier, Mimi Rhodes, Paula Schulz-Hanßen
2017: Letizia Bagnoli, Mathilde Claisse, Julia Engström, Alessandra Fanali, Linn Grant, Esther Henseleit, Frida Kinhult, Amanda Linnér, Alessia Nobilio, Emma Spitz, Maja Stark, Beatrice Wallin
2015: Mathilda Cappeliez, Elin Esborn, Leonie Harm, Agathe Laisné, Olivia Mahaffey, Sandra Nordaas, María Parra, Ana Peláez, Marta Pérez Sanmartin, Emma Spitz, Puk Lyng Thomsen, Albane Valenzuela
2013: Shannon Aubert, Virginia Elena Carta, Georgia Hall, Anyssia Herbaut, Karolin Lampert, Bronte Law, Harang Lee, Emily Kristine Pedersen, Amber Ratcliffe, Linnea Ström, Anne van Dam, Jessica Vasilic
2011: Emilie Alonso, Amy Boulden, Céline Boutier, Manon Gidali, Charley Hull, Emma Nilsson, Leona Maguire, Lisa Maguire, Antonia Scherer, Luna Sobrón, Lauren Taylor, Margaux Vanmol
2009: Anna Arrese, Rosanna Crépiat, Tonje Daffinrud, Ana Fernández de Mesa, Leona Maguire, Lisa Maguire, Sherlyn Popelka, Sophia Popov, Klára Spilková, Kelly Tidy, Johanna Tillström, Sally Watson
2007: Henrietta Brockway, Carlota Ciganda, Audrey Goumard, Caroline Hedwall, Jacqueline Hedwall, Charlotte Lorentzen, Sara Monberg, Nathalie Månsson, Florentyna Parker, Nicola Rössler, Marta Silva, Sally Watson. Caroline Masson withdrew and was replaced by Jacqueline Hedwall.
2005: Carlota Ciganda, Alessandra De Luigi, Lene Krog, Caroline Masson, Belén Mozo, Azahara Muñoz, Anna Nordqvist, Florentyna Parker, Beatriz Recari, Melissa Reid, Marta Silva, Bénédicte Toumpsin
2003: Minea Blomqvist, Emma Cabrera-Bello, Claire Grignolo, María Hernández, Pernilla Lindberg, Belén Mozo, Azahara Muñoz, Dewi Claire Schreefel, Marianne Skarpnord, Louise Stahle, Caroline Westrup, Adriana Zwank
2002: Carmen Alonso, Minea Blomqvist, Mélodie Bourdy, Emma Cabrera-Bello, Inés Díaz-Negrete, Claire Grignolo, María Hernández, Azahara Muñoz, Maria Recasens, Dewi Claire Schreefel, Elisa Serramia, Louise Stahle

See also
Junior Ryder Cup

References

External links
2005 PING Junior Solheim Cup official site 

Junior golf tournaments
Team golf tournaments
Women's golf tournaments
 
Women's golf tournaments in the United States
Recurring sporting events established in 2002